Internationale Spieltage SPIEL, often called the Essen Game Fair after the city where it is held, is an annual four-day boardgame trade fair which is also open to the public held in October (Thursday to the following Sunday) at the Messe Essen exhibition centre in Essen, Germany. It began in 1983. With 1 021 exhibitors from 50 nations in 2016, SPIEL is the biggest fair for board games in the world. Many new games are released at the fair each year, especially (but not exclusively) European-style board games.

At SPIEL board games are offered which are hard to find in retail because a lot of international and small exhibitors present their products. While the prices for buying the games at the fair do not tend to be significantly lower than those in retail, the games are typically available sooner than in regular board game shops, come with promotional materials (mostly extra cards or tokens with a few more game mechanics, but also T-shirts and similar merchandise) and it is an occasion where passionate board gamers can meet and chat with game designers, illustrators, and famous game reviewers.



See also
Going Cardboard (documentary)

Notes

References

External links

Official website

Annual fairs
Fairs in Germany
Gaming conventions
Trade fairs in Germany
1983 establishments in Germany
Recurring events established in 1983